Block Elements is a Unicode block containing square block symbols of various fill and shading. Used along with block elements are box-drawing characters, shade characters, and terminal graphic characters. These can be used for filling regions of the screen and portraying drop shadows. Its block name in Unicode 1.0 was Blocks.

Character table

Font coverage
Font sets like Code2000 and the DejaVu family—include coverage for each of the glyphs in the Block Elements range, Unifont also contains all the glyphs. Among the fonts in widespread use, full implementation is provided by Segoe UI Symbol.

The glyphs in Block Elements each share the same character width in most supported fonts, allowing them to be used graphically in row and column arrangements.  However, the block doesn't contain a space character of its own and ASCII space may or may not render at the same width as Block Elements glyphs, as those characters are intended to be used exclusively for monospaced fonts.

Compact table

History
The following Unicode-related documents record the purpose and process of defining specific characters in the Block Elements block:

Related symbols 
  in the Mathematical Operators Unicode block.
  in the Geometric Shapes Unicode block.

See also 
 Tombstone (typography)
 Box-drawing character
 Semigraphics (or pseudographics)
 Other Unicode blocks containing semigraphic characters:
 Box Drawing
 Geometric Shapes
 Symbols for Legacy Computing
 Code page 437, the character set of the original IBM PC
 Unicode symbols
 Dingbat

References 

Unicode blocks